Clinton, Texas may refer to the following places in the U.S. state of Texas:
Clinton, DeWitt County, Texas, a ghost town
Clinton, Hunt County, Texas, an unincorporated community
Clinton, Harris County, Texas, now annexed to Houston.